Mega Man is a video game franchise created by Capcom.

Mega Man, Megaman or  MegaMan may also refer to:

Characters 
 Mega Man (character), title character from the series
 Megaman, the Marvel Comics villain who first appeared in "Nova" Vol. 1, Issue #8 (April, 1977)

Music 
 Megaman, member of UK garage/hip hop group So Solid Crew
 "MegaMan" (song), a 2011 song by Lil Wayne from album Tha Carter IV

Television 
 Mega Man (1994 TV series), a Japanese/Canadian/American animated television series
 MegaMan NT Warrior, a 2002 anime series
 Mega Man Star Force (TV series), a 2006 anime series
 Mega Man: Fully Charged, a 2018 American-Japanese-Canadian animated television series

Video games 
 Mega Man (original series)
 Mega Man (1987 video game), first video game of the series
 Mega Man (1990 video game), released for DOS systems
 Mega Man (1995 video game), released for the Game Gear

Other 
 Mega Man: Upon a Star, a 3 episode OVA series